Luke E. Linnan (April 8, 1895 – September 17, 1975) was a justice of the Iowa Supreme Court from September 3, 1958, to December 15, 1958, appointed from Kossuth County, Iowa.

References

Justices of the Iowa Supreme Court
1895 births
1975 deaths
20th-century American judges